Cylindera agnata is an extant species of tiger beetle in the genus Cylindera.

References

agnata
Beetles described in 1890